The Sleep (Romanian Somnul) is an oil painting by Corneliu Baba, from 1959.

Description
The painting size is 100 x 120 cm. It is in the collection of the Timișoara Art Museum.

Analysis
Two working people sleep in their clothes on a brown field. His realist works show working people.

References

Sources

External links
Colecţia Baba, Muzeul de Artă Timișoara

1959 paintings
Romanian paintings